Carlos Rivas may refer to:

Carlos Rivas (actor) (1925–2003), American actor 
Carlos Rivas (footballer, born 1953), Chilean football midfielder
Carlos Rivas Godoy (born 1985), Canadian footballer; son of the Chilean Carlos Rivas
Carlos Rivas (footballer, born 1991), Colombian football winger
Carlos Rivas (footballer, born 1994), Colombian football forward
Carlos Rivas Quiñones (active from 2013), Puerto Rican attorney and economist